Zarren is a town in Kortemark, West Flanders province, Belgium.

External links

Zarren @ City Review

Populated places in West Flanders